KISF (103.5 FM, "Zona MX 103.5") is a commercial radio station located in Las Vegas, Nevada.  KISF airs a regional Mexican music format, and is the Las Vegas affiliate for El Bueno, La Mala, Y El Feo in the morning.  Its studios are in Spring Valley and its transmitter is on Black Mountain in Henderson. KISF is owned by Latino Media Network; under a local marketing agreement, the station is programmed by previous owner TelevisaUnivision's Uforia Audio Network.

History

Adult contemporary (1989-1992) 
KISF signed on as KLTN with an adult contemporary format as "Lite 103.5" in February 1989. In January 1991, the station rebranded as "Magic 103.5" under new call letters KMMK.

Modern rock (1992-1998) 
On May 22, 1992, the station changed call letters to KEDG, and adopted a modern rock music format, branded as "The Edge". The station debuted at #1 in the Las Vegas ratings and was influential in other stations nationwide flipping to the format. In 1996, KEDG gained a direct competitor as KFBI adopted a harder edged modern rock music format under the call letters KXTE.

R&B oldies (1998-1999) 
On June 5, 1998, at Noon, KEDG flipped to urban oldies under the call letters KISF, and branded as "Kiss-FM".

Spanish (1999-present) 
In March 1999, Heftel Broadcasting Corporation (which eventually became Univision Radio and then Uforia Audio Network) acquired the frequency, and flipped 103.5 to Regional Mexican as "La Nueva 103.5", becoming the first Spanish FM radio station serving the Las Vegas Hispanic community. On March 24, 2016, KISF rebranded as "Zona MX 103.5".

KISF was one of eighteen radio stations that TelevisaUnivision sold to Latino Media Network in a $60 million deal announced in June 2022, approved by the Federal Communications Commission (FCC) that November, and completed in January 2023. Under the terms of the deal, Univision agreed to continue programming the station for up to one year under a local marketing agreement.

References

External links
KISF official website

Regional Mexican radio stations in the United States
ISF
Radio stations established in 1992
Univision Radio Network stations
1992 establishments in Nevada